Jang Seong-eun (born November 18, 1991), known professionally as Stella Jang, is a South Korean singer-songwriter. She graduated from Lycée Henri-IV and AgroParisTech. She got her name from her French teacher who thought her Korean name would be hard to pronounce for French people.

Life and career

Pre-debut
Jang moved to Paris at the age of 12 and graduated from a grande école. She produced songs at a hip-hop platform, Jungle Radio, where Zico and RM were working. She participated in some of the songs from the album Backpack by the South Korean hip-hop duo Geeks.

2014–2015: Debut and early songs
She then returned to Korea, where she made her first attempt to become a singer in the K-pop genre. Unlike some performers in the genre, she had not trained under one of the various management agencies that typically produce K-pop idols. Her first single, "Dumped Yesterday", was released in 2014, and was described as a song with bright sounding guitar strings. However, it drew little attention. In March 2015, Stella released her second single, "It’s Raining" featuring rapper Verbal Jint. In a 2015 interview with BNT News (where she was described as a female hip hop musician), she said her music was influenced by the 90s sound and tried to reflect elements that would bring relatability with her audiences. In September 2015, she released her third single  (Portrait of you), a song about her parents.

2016: First EP Colors
In 2016, she released her first EP Colors and was described as an artist loved by hipsters. The album was described as "emotional music mixed with rhythmical raps".

2017: Appearance on Problematic Men and mainstream breakthrough
She attracted significant interest in 2017 after an appearance on the Korean TV show Problematic Men. Stella debuted as a radio DJ for Gyeonggi Broadcasting on April 22. On April 30, she released the single "Vanishing Paycheck" that criticizes the reality of office workers. In June 2017, she performed her first solo concert  (Knock Knock) at Hyundaicard Understage.

2018–2019: Staples and Substances Dangereuses
She released her project album Staples in January 2018, which was produced by Pleyne and featured a hip hop and R&B sound. In March 2019, she released Substances Dangereuses, an album that uses fine dust as a metaphor for harsh realities.

2019–present: TikTok fame, STELLA I and Stairs
From late 2019, her song "Colors" — which contained the lyrics ‘I could be red or I could be yellow I could be blue or I could be purple I could be green or pink or black or white I could be every color you like’ — from her 2016 eponymous EP newly gained global popularity around the world through TikTok and boosted the popularity in South Korea. In 2020, Stella released her first studio album STELLA I.

Stella Jang co-wrote the song "Friends" by BTS for Map of the Soul: 7.

In 2021, she released her EP Stairs.

Personal life
Stella Jang is fluent in four languages, which are Korean, French, Spanish, and English. In 2021, she revealed she was suffering from a rare disease called rhabdomyolysis.

Discography

Studio albums

Extended plays

Singles

As songwriter for other artists 

She also worked on the vocal arrangement of LE SSERAFIM's EP Fearless.

Filmography

Web shows

References

1991 births
Living people
21st-century South Korean women singers
K-pop singers
South Korean women pop singers
South Korean women singer-songwriters
South Korean rhythm and blues singers
South Korean hip hop singers
French-language singers
Indie pop musicians
South Korean expatriates in France
Lycée Henri-IV alumni